The Cirencester branch line was a five-mile-long single-track branch railway line in Gloucestershire, England that connected Cirencester to the main line at Kemble. It was opened by the Cheltenham and Great Western Union Railway in 1841. The main line was extended from Kemble to a junction near Gloucester in 1845, by the GWR which had taken over the C&GWUR. The branch supported a busy passenger and goods business, but these declined in the 1930s, and closure was threatened in the 1950s. To reduce costs and maintain the viability of the line, lightweight four-wheel diesel railbuses were introduced, and they proved popular. Nevertheless, the line's decline was inexorable, passenger service closed in 1964 and the goods service ending the following year.

The route crossed the River Thames near its source and formed the highest rail crossing point on the river.

Cheltenham and Great Western Union Railway
The Great Western Railway opened its main line between London and Bristol in 1841. During the construction period, an independent company called the Cheltenham and Great Western Union Railway obtained authorisation on 21 June 1836 to make a line from the GWR at Swindon, to Cheltenham by way of Stroud and Gloucester. The estimated cost of construction was £750,000.

As well as the main line between Swindon and Cheltenham, there was to be a branch to Cirencester, terminating at a place there referred to as Botany Bay. A landowner at Kemble, named Robert Gordon, was evidently hostile to the railway, and he secured clauses in the authorising Act requiring a tunnel, not needed for engineering purposes, near Kemble. Moreover, the railway was forbidden to open a public station on Gordon's estate. The new line was to be on the broad gauge.

The money market was extremely depressed in the period following authorisation of the line, and subscriptions could not be secured to make material progress on construction. In desperation, the directors determined to construct between Swindon and Cirencester only for the time being, for that would give the best chance of getting an income that would pay a dividend on the outlay. The company arranged a provisional lease with the Great Western Railway, in which the GWR would pay £17,000 annually for the use of the (as yet unbuilt) line.

The Bristol and Gloucester Railway was relying on timely completion of the C&GWUR at the Gloucester and Cheltenham end of the line, and obtained Parliamentary clauses in C&GWUR Acts pressuring the Cheltenham company to complete at the Gloucester end of the line, and the emphasis on early construction passed to that area. In November 1840 even that work proved impossible to finance, and attention reverted to the Swindon end of the line.

Progress was eventually made, and the line opened between Swindon and Cirencester on 31 May 1841. It was a single broad gauge line; stations were at Purton, Minety and Cirencester, so there was no intermediate station on what was to be the branch line. The line was leased to the GWR as arranged, for a period of seven years. In 1842 the C&GWUR obtained Parliamentary authorisation to sell their line to the GWR. The main line company was not yet ready to purchase, but after a delay the transfer was agreed in January 1843. The actual amalgamation took place on 1 July 1843; the GWR spent £230,000 in the acquisition of the line, which so far had cost the C&GWUR £600,000 to construct.

The GWR did not hasten to complete the line, but it opened from Kemble to Standish Junction, joining the Bristol line there, on 12 May 1845. Kemble thus became the junction station for what was now the Cirencester branch. Robert Gordon's restrictive clauses prevented the opening of a public station there, and the GWR contented itself with an exchange station, not accessible for joining and leaving passengers or goods. Tetbury was served by a station named Tetbury Road, located on the main line immediately north of the Cirencester to Tetbury road, just outside Gordon's estate (and near the present-day Thames Head public house).

Gauge conversion
The Cirencester branch had been opened as a broad gauge line. The GWR undertook a widespread conversion to narrow (standard) gauge in the general area in 1872, and the Cirencester branch was closed on 22 May for the conversion work and reopened as a standard gauge line on 27 May. Passengers were conveyed by omnibus to and from Tetbury Road station during the closure.

Cirencester station
The station originally had an overall roof, but this was removed in 1874.

Kemble station

Kemble station was fully open to the public on 1 May 1882.

Signalling improvements
In 1908, the Webb-Thompson electric train staff system was installed on the branch. The Cirencester line was controlled from Kemble East signalbox and Cirencester. During 1929 Kemble East signalbox was abolished, and a new 62 lever Kemble signalbox installed. Because of the curvature of the platform at Kemble there was an auxiliary staff instrument on the platform.  In 1936, there were eleven passenger trains each way daily, as well as three goods trains. By 1954, the passenger service was reduced to nine trains daily.

Train service in 1922
In 1922, there were ten trains daily, but no Sunday service.

Cirencester station renovation
In 1956, work was carried out towards renovation of Cirencester station, but the work was suspended, leaving the buildings in a partly completed state.

Diesel railbuses

In an attempt to save the line from closure, diesel railbuses were introduced on the line in February 1959 to reduce costs. The train service was increased to fourteen trains per day and halts were opened at Chesterton Lane and, in January 1960, at Park Leaze. Results were encouraging: 130,000 passengers yearly, an average of about 13 per train. Particularly on Saturdays, the railbus was overcrowded. The original intention was to run railbuses through to Swindon to avoid a change of trains at Kemble, but this proved impossible as the lightweight vehicles did not reliably operate the signalling track circuits on the main line.

Nevertheless, despite the initial success, the passenger service was not financially viable, and it was withdrawn on 6 April 1964. Goods traffic was withdrawn on 4 October 1965.

After closure
 Cirencester ring road was built on part of the railway in the mid 1970s and as such has made any chance of reopening a railway to Cirencester Town station impossible and costly.

Future
In 2016, discussions took place regarding the potential of relaying 5 km of track from Kemble station to the edge of Cirencester at Chesterton Halt.

In January 2019, the Campaign for Better Transport identified the line as Priority 2 for reopening. Priority 2 is for those lines which require further development or a change in circumstances (such as housing developments).

Two bids for feasibility study funding were made to the Department for Transport's 'restoring your railway' fund in March and June 2020, and the second was successful.

Station list

 Kemble; opened for exchange purposes only 12 May 1845; opened to public 1 May 1882; still open;
 Park Leaze Halt; opened 4 January 1960; closed 6 April 1964;
 Chesterton Lane Halt; opened 2 February 1959; closed 6 April 1964;
 Cirencester; opened 31 May 1841; renamed Cirencester Town 1 July 1924; closed 6 April 1964.

Notes

References

External links
 Line History
 One inch 1948 map

Closed railway lines in South West England
Rail transport in Gloucestershire
Railway lines opened in 1841
Cirencester